National Multiple Sclerosis Society, National Capital Chapter is a local chapter of the National Multiple Sclerosis Society.  The National Capital Chapter, founded in 1957, promotes, researches, educates, and advocates on issues relating to multiple sclerosis.  The organization also provides a wide range of programs, including support for the newly diagnosed and those living with MS in the Washington, D.C. metropolitan area as well.  Along with Washington, D.C., its service area includes: Calvert, Charles, Montgomery, Prince George's and St. Mary's counties in Maryland; and Alexandria, Arlington, Fairfax, Fauquier, Loudoun, and Prince William counties in Virginia.

Services 

The National MS Society, National Capital Chapter provides a wealth of support services to those living with MS and their families.  These services, aimed to help make living with MS easier, include counseling, medical referrals, educational programs, family support, and wellness programming.   Each program is designed to maximize the ability of people with MS to maintain independence, to continue to participate in jobs, family life, and in the community. From offering general information on the disease, to education and exercise programs, to respite care, the Chapter works to meet the many different needs of people living with MS. The Chapter also offers limited financial support to help people when costs for services increase with the severity of MS.

Their Operation Job Match initiative serves to enable not only people living with MS, but also people who live with other adult-onset physical disabilities to make career decisions.

Fundraising Events 

Along with its services, the National MS Society, National Capital Chapter hosts a variety of events as part of the Society's mission to “mobilize people and resources to drive research for a cure and to address the challenges of everyone affected by MS.”   These events include:
 Walk MS
 Bike MS: Ride the Riverside (formerly Beyond the Beltway
 Women on the Move Luncheon
 Golf MS (formerly Longest Day of Golf)
 Capital Challenge Walk MS
 Ambassadors Ball

Advocacy 

The National MS Society, National Capital Chapter advocates for federal, state, and local government change for people with MS.  The organization works with people with MS, their families, community organizations, and legislators to improve access to quality health care, make MS therapies more affordable, increase access to affordable, accessible housing and transportation.  They work for disability rights, MS research funding, and quality choices for community-based long-term care services.  Their local issues, such as building accessibility, fair hiring practices, and accessible transportation come mainly from individuals who contact the chapter directly regarding an issue or problem.  The organization also advocates on a state level with policy platforms focused on Maryland, Virginia, and Washington, D.C.

References 

Multiple sclerosis organizations